This is a list of radio telescopes – over one hundred – that are or have been used for radio astronomy. The list includes both single dishes and interferometric arrays. The list is sorted by region, then by name; unnamed telescopes are in reverse size order at the end of the list.

The first radio telescope was invented in 1932, when Karl Jansky at Bell Telephone Laboratories observed radiation coming from the Milky Way.

Africa

Antarctica

Asia

Australia

Europe

North America

South America

Arctic Ocean

Atlantic Ocean

Indian Ocean

Pacific Ocean

Space-based

Under construction or planned construction

Proposed telescopes

Gallery of big dishes

See also 
 Category:Radio telescopes
 List of astronomical observatories
 Lists of telescopes
 Radio telescope

References

External links 
 List of radio telescopes outside the US
 List of radio telescopes in the US
 East Anglian Amateur Radio Observatory Website

Radio telescopes